Five ships of the French navy have borne the name Clorinde, in honour of 
Clorinda in Jerusalem Delivered.

Ships named Clorinde 
 , a 44-gun  frigate.
 , a 44-gun frigate.
 , a 52-gun frigate.
 Clorinde (1837), a frigate started in Brest but never completed.
 , a sail and steam frigate.
 , a submarine launched in 1913 and stricken in 1927

See also

Notes and references

Notes

References

Bibliography 
 
 

French Navy ship names